The Mustang is a 2019 English-language drama film written by Laure de Clermont-Tonnerre, Mona Fastvold, and Brock Norman Brock, and directed by Clermont-Tonnerre in her feature directorial debut. It stars Matthias Schoenaerts as an incarcerated inmate who participates in a rehabilitation program centered around training of wild horses. Jason Mitchell, Gideon Adlon, Connie Britton, and Bruce Dern appear in supporting roles. The Mustang is based on an actual rehabilitation program in Carson City, Nevada.

The film had its world premiere at the Sundance Film Festival on January 31, 2019, and was released in the United States on March 15, 2019, by Focus Features.

Plot
Roman Coleman has been incarcerated for 12 years after leaving his domestic partner permanently brain damaged in an attack. Aware of his short temper and violent tendencies, he has resisted efforts to be reintegrated back into society. While working outdoor maintenance, Roman is placed in a rehabilitation program run by rancher Myles that assigns prisoners with training wild mustangs. Each prisoner in the program is given a specific horse to train and Roman is required to complete the training within 12 weeks before his horse is sold at an auction.

Roman initially struggles with the training of his mustang, but under the guidance of Henry, an inmate regarded as the top horse trainer, he begins to make progress. As the weeks pass, Roman becomes close with the horse, whom he names Marquis, and forms a friendship with Henry. The program suffers a blow, however, when Henry is murdered by Dan, Roman's cellmate. Roman retaliates by strangling Dan into unconsciousness before they are broken up by guards.

The day of the auction arrives, which Roman invites his pregnant daughter Martha to attend with the hope of improving his relationship with her. While Roman showcases Marquis to the auctioneers, he becomes distracted after he notices Martha is not present. This distraction leads to disaster when Marquis is startled by an overhead helicopter, causing Roman to fall off his horse and nearly be trampled as the other trainers restrain Marquis. Shortly afterwards, Roman learns from Myles that Marquis has been deemed untrainable and will be euthanized. Taking advantage of the prison gates being damaged by a storm, Roman is able to help Marquis escape.

Some time later, Roman receives a letter from Martha acknowledging her father's refusal to leave prison. The letter also includes a photo of Martha with Roman's newly-born grandson, who she intends to have Roman meet during her next visit. After Roman finishes reading the letter, he spots Marquis standing by the prison gates and smiles.

Cast
 Matthias Schoenaerts as Roman Coleman
 Jason Mitchell as Henry Cooper
 Bruce Dern as Myles
 Gideon Adlon as Martha Coleman
 Connie Britton as Psychologist
 Josh Stewart as Dan
 Noel Gugliemi as Roberto
 Thomas Smittle as Tom

Production
In May 2017, it was announced Matthias Schoenaerts and Jason Mitchell had joined the cast of the film, with Laure de Clermont-Tonnerre directing from a screenplay she wrote, alongside Mona Fastvold and Brock Norman Brock. Canal+, Cine+, will produce the film, alongside Alain Goldman and Molly Hallam serving as a producer and executive producer under their Legende banner. In October 2017, Susan Sarandon, Gideon Adlon, Bruce Dern, Josh Stewart joined the cast of the film. Sarandon later departed from the cast and was replaced by Connie Britton.

Filming took place at the Nevada State Prison in Carson City, Nevada.

Release
It had its world premiere at the Sundance Film Festival on January 31, 2019. It was released in a limited theatrical release on March 15, 2019, and on VOD by Universal Home Entertainment on June 4, 2019.

Reception

Box office
The Mustang grossed grossed $5.3 million in the United States and Canada, and a worldwide total of $6.7 million.

Critical response
The site's critical consensus reads "The Mustang finds fresh perspectives in a familiar redemption tale brought brilliantly to life by powerful performances from Bruce Dern and Matthias Schoenaerts." On Metacritic, the film has a weighted average score of 77 out of 100, based on 36 critics, indicating "generally favorable reviews".

References

External links 
 
 
 

2019 films
2019 directorial debut films
English-language French films
English-language Belgian films
French drama films
Belgian drama films
Focus Features films
Films about horses
Films set in Nevada
Films scored by Jed Kurzel
2019 drama films
2010s English-language films
2010s French films